The Vickers F.B.11 was a prototype British three-seat escort fighter of the First World War.  A large single-engined biplane, it carried one gunner in a nacelle mounted on the upper wing to give an allround field of fire.  Only a single example was completed.

Development and design
In early 1916, the British War Office drew up a specification for a multi-seat escort fighter to be powered by one of the new Rolls-Royce Eagle engines, intended to protect formations of bombers from German fighters such as the Fokker E.I, with an additional role of destroying enemy airships. While the specification did not require high speed, a good field of fire for its guns was essential, while the secondary anti-Zeppelin role demanded an  endurance of at least seven hours.

Orders were placed for prototypes from Armstrong Whitworth (the F.K.6), Sopwith (the L.R.T.Tr.) and Vickers. All three designs were driven by the need to provide wide fields of fire in the absence of an effective synchronisation gear that would allow safe firing of guns through the propeller disc.

The Vickers response, the F.B.11, designed by R. L. Howard-Flanders, was a large, single-bay, biplane of tractor layout.  The pilot and one gunner sat in separate but closely spaced cockpits under the trailing edge of the upper wing, while a second gunner sat in a nacelle, or "fighting top", attached to, and extending forward of the upper wing. The Eagle engine was mounted in a clean cowling, with the radiator fitted behind the engine in the fuselage.

Two prototypes were ordered, with the first flying in September–October 1916, being tested at RNAS Eastchurch in November that year. It proved to have poor lateral control and performance, and was destroyed in a crash.  The second prototype was not completed, and as effective synchronising gears were now available (including Vickers' own Vickers-Challenger gear), none of the escort fighters were developed further.

Specifications

See also

Notes

References

 Andrews, C. F., and Morgan, E. B. Vickers Aircraft since 1908. London: Putnam, 1988. .
Bruce, J. M. British Aeroplanes 1914-18. London: Putnam, 1957.
Bruce, J. M. War Planes of the First World War: Volume Three Fighters. London: Macdonald, 1969. .
Green, William, and Swanborough, Gordon. The Complete Book of Fighters. New York: Smithmark, 1994. .
Lewis, Peter. The British Fighter since 1912. London: Putnam, Fourth edition, 1979. .
Mason, Francis K. The British Fighter since 1912. Annapolis, Maryland, USA: Naval Institute Press, 1992. 

1910s British fighter aircraft
F.B.11
Military aircraft of World War I
Aircraft first flown in 1916